Year 1133 (MCXXXIII) was a common year starting on Sunday (link will display the full calendar) of the Julian calendar.

Events 
 By place 

 Europe 
 Spring – A German expeditionary force, led by King Lothair III, marches into northern Italy, and arrives at Rome, after a 6-month journey across the Alps. Accompanied by Bernard of Clairvaux, French abbot and Doctor of the Church, Lothair is crowned by Pope Innocent II as Holy Roman Emperor at the Church of the Lateran, on June 4. He receives as papal fiefs the vast estates of Matilda, former margravine of Tuscany, which he secures for his daughter Gertrude of Süpplingenburg and her husband, Duke Henry X (the Proud) of Bavaria.
 July 17 – Battle of Fraga: The Castellan troops led by King Alfonso I (the Battler) defeat the Almoravid army, thanks to a timely intervention of a Norman Crusader army from Tarragona, led by Robert Bordet. 
 Ramon Berenguer IV, count of Barcelona, launches a raid against Almoravid-held territories in Al-Andalus (modern Spain), and pillages the country all the way to Cadiz.

 By topic 

 Religion 
 The first convent on Iceland, the Þingeyraklaustur, is inaugurated at a monastery of the Order of Saint Benedict (located in Þingeyrar).
 Antipope Anacletus II forces Innocent II out of Rome following the departure of Lothair III. Innocent flees and takes a ship to Pisa.
 Geoffrey of Monmouth, an English cleric, writes the chronicle Historia Regum Britanniae.
 Rijnsburg Abbey is founded by Petronilla of Lorraine, countess and regent of Holland.
 Construction of the chapter house at Durham Cathedral which is completed in 1140.

Births 
 February 23 – Al-Zafir, Fatimid caliph (d. 1154)
 March 5 – Henry II (Curtmantle), king of England (d. 1189)
 May 13 – Hōnen, Japanese religious reformer (d. 1212)
 Abu al-Abbas al-Jarawi, Moroccan poet (d. 1212)
 Andronikos Doukas Angelos, Byzantine aristocrat 
 Andronikos Kontostephanos, Byzantine aristocrat
 Faidiva of Toulouse, countess of Savoy (d. 1154)
 Jean de Gisors, Norman nobleman (d. 1220)
 Ralph de Sudeley, English nobleman (d. 1192)
 Sigurd II (or Sigurd Munn), king of Norway (d. 1155)
 Stephen IV, king of Hungary and Croatia (d. 1165)
 Thorlak Thorhallsson, Icelandic bishop (d. 1193)
 Urraca of Castile, queen of Navarre (d. 1179)
 Zhang Shi, Chinese Confucian scholar (d. 1181)

Deaths 
 February 19 – Irene Doukaina, Byzantine empress (b. 1066)
 May 1 – Manegold von Mammern, German abbot
 December 4 – Bernard degli Uberti, Italian bishop 
 December 18 – Hildebert, French hagiographer (b. 1055)
 December 21 – Guigues III (the Old), French nobleman 
 Dirmicius of Regensburg, Irish monk and abbot 
 Gregory of Catino, Italian monk and historian (b. 1060)
 þorlákur Runólfsson, Icelandic bishop (b. 1086)
 William of Zardana (or Saône), French nobleman

References

Sources